Prince Luigi Marcantonio Francesco Rodolfo Scipione Borghese, commonly known as Scipione Borghese (11 September 1871, Migliarino – 18 November 1927, Florence), was an Italian aristocrat, industrialist, politician, explorer, mountain climber and racing driver belonging to the House of Borghese.

He is best known for participating in (and winning) the Peking to Paris race in 1907, accompanied by the journalist Luigi Barzini Sr. and  Ettore Guizzardi, the prince's chauffeur, who apparently did most of the driving.  Nevertheless, before 1907 he had already become known internationally as a traveller, explorer, diplomat and mountain climber.  In 1900 he had finished a journey in Asia from Beirut to the Pacific Ocean. His book In Asia: Siria, Eufrate, Babilonia (In Asia:  Syria, Euphrates, Babylon), published in 1903 and which proved a success, describes his journey from Beirut to Basra and the head of the Persian Gulf.  Subsequently, he also completed a journey across China, recounted in another book, Catching Fire.

Tall and abstemious, he was a man of few words, cold, with calm and measured manners, and with great self-control.  He was a deputy of the Partito Radicale in the Italian parliament of 1904 to 1913, fought bravely in the First World War, and began important improvement works in the "Agro Romano".

Family
Borghese was the eldest son of Paolo, 9th Prince of Sulmona (1845–1920) and his wife Ilona, Countess Apponyi de Nagy-Appony. He was twice married, firstly to Anna Maria de Ferrari (23 March 1874 – 25 November 1924), daughter of Gaetano, duca di Ferrari by his wife Maria Annenkov, on 23 May 1895, and they had two daughters.  His second marriage to Teodora Martini on 8 August 1926 produced no issue.  He was succeeded in the title Prince of Sulmona by his brother Livio Borghese, 11th Prince of Sulmona (1874–1939), second son of the 9th Prince.

Children
 Santa Borghese (1 November 1897 Île de France, Paris – 13 April 1997 Rome). She married on 4 July 1925 at Isola Borghese, Lago di Garda, Astorre Hercolani, 9º principe Hercolani. They have 7 children with an A beginning surname. 
 Livia Borghese (4 March 1901 Île de France, Paris  – 14 December 1969 Bologna, nine months after the death of her husband); she married on 30 December 1930 at Isola Borghese, Lago di Garda, Alessandro, conte Cavazza (1895–1969), by whom she had three sons (the eldest apparently born in 1922, or eight years before her marriage), and several descendants.

Sources
This page is a translation of its Italian counterpart.

External links
 
 

Italian explorers
Italian businesspeople
Italian travel writers
20th-century travel writers
Italian male writers
Italian military personnel of World War I
Italian mountain climbers
Italian racing drivers
Italian Radical Party politicians
Deputies of Legislature XXII of the Kingdom of Italy
Deputies of Legislature XXIII of the Kingdom of Italy
Scipione
1871 births
1927 deaths
People from the Province of Ferrara
20th-century Italian politicians
International Olympic Committee members